Robert Pincus-Witten (April 5, 1935 – January 28, 2018) was an American art critic, curator and art historian.

Biography
Born in New York City, Pincus-Witten earned his undergraduate degree at The Cooper Union, in New York City in 1956. He wrote his master's degree (1962) and Ph.D. (1968) both at the University of Chicago. His dissertation, on Joséphin Péladan and the Salon de la Rose + Croix was written under Joshua Taylor and John Rewald.

Pincus-Witten joined the City University of New York in 1964. In 1970 he was promoted to professor at CUNY. Pincus-Witten retired from CUNY in 1990.

In 1966 he began writing criticism for Artforum magazine as its senior editor. He became associate editor of Artforum in 1976.

An initial book on minimalism and the era following it was issued in 1977. His collected art criticism was published as Eye to Eye: Twenty Years of Art Criticism, in 1984. His treatise on post-modern art, Postminimalism into Maximalism: American Art 1966-1986, appeared in 1987. Postminimalism is an art term coined (as "post-minimalism") by Pincus-Witten in 1971 used in various artistic fields for work which is influenced by, or attempts to develop and go beyond, the aesthetic of minimalism.

Pincus-Witten curated art shows for the Gagosian Gallery (East) in New York City, until 1996. That same year he joined the staff of C&M Arts (Mnuchin Fine Arts), New York City as Director of Exhibitions and then retired after eleven years.

On July 3, 2013, Pincus-Witten and Leon Hecht were married in NYC.

Bibliography
 Postminimalism. New York: Out of London Press, 1977
 Entries (Maximalism): Art at the Turn of the Decade
 New York: Out of London Press, 1983; and Armstrong, Richard, and Hanhardt, John G.  
 The New Sculpture 1965–75: between Geometry and Gesture. 1976
 New York: Whitney Museum of American Art, 1990
 Postminimalism into Maximalism: American Art, 1966–1986. Ann Arbor, MI : UMI Research Press, 1987
 Eye to Eye: Twenty Years of Art Criticism, Ann Arbor, MI: UMI Research Press, 1984.

See also
 Conceptual art
 Post-conceptual
 Postmodern art
 Postminimalism

Notes and references

1935 births
2018 deaths
American art critics
American art historians
Cultural historians
City University of New York faculty
People from New York City